Andrei Vladimirovich Kozyrev (born 27 March 1951) is a Russian politician who served as the former and the first Minister of Foreign Affairs of the Russian Federation under President Boris Yeltsin, in office for the Russian SFSR from October 1990 and, after the dissolution of the Soviet Union, from 1992 until January 1996 for Russia. In his position, he was credited with developing Russia's foreign policy immediately after the fall of the Soviet Union, although many in Russia have criticized him for being weak and not assertive enough in defending Russian interests in the face of NATO in places such as Bosnia and Iraq. 

He was the Russian representative during the signing of the Oslo I Accord, for which he received criticism from Russian nationalist politicians and parties. His anti-imperialist and pro-western positions, however, were positively viewed. Kozyrev had graduated from the Moscow State Institute of International Relations (MGIMO) with a PhD in history before joining the Soviet Ministry of Foreign Affairs in 1974, holding various positions in it before being appointed foreign minister.

Early life and education
Kozyrev was born in Brussels in 1951, the son of a Soviet engineer temporarily working there. He was educated at the Moscow State Institute of International Relations, a school for diplomats operated by the Ministry of Foreign Affairs. Before beginning his studies there in 1969, he spent a year as a fitter in the Kommunar machine-building factory in Moscow.

Career

Diplomat in Soviet Ministry of Foreign Affairs
Kozyrev completed his studies in 1974. He then entered the Soviet Ministry of Foreign Affairs as a speech writer and researcher in the Department of International Organizations, which was responsible for issues concerning the United Nations and arms control, including biological and chemical warfare issues. Over the next three years, he earned a post-graduate degree in historical science and published several books on the arms trade and the United Nations.

Kozyrev's career in the Foreign Ministry marked him as a promising young Soviet diplomat. He became an attaché in the Department of International Organizations in 1979 and third secretary the next year. Promotions came regularly: he became second secretary in 1982; first secretary in 1984; counselor in 1986. Following the reorganization of the ministry by Gorbachev's foreign minister, Eduard Shevardnadze, he became deputy chief of the renamed Administration of International Organizations in 1988. The next year Kozyrev became chief of the administration, replacing a man 20 years his senior.

Kozyrev was promoted to the diplomatic rank of the Ambassador Extraordinary and Plenipotentiary — the highest diplomatic rank in the Soviet Union — by the Decree of the President of the Soviet Union Mikhail Gorbachev of 12 December 1990 No. UP-1177.

Career as Minister of Foreign Affairs

Seizing the opportunity opened by Gorbachev's glasnost in summer 1989, Kozyrev wrote an article repudiating the Leninist concept of the "international class struggle," the very essence of Leninism. Firstly published in the Soviet press, the article was reproduced in the Washington Post and other major news sources all over the world, making him known as a political figure.

In October 1990, a rebellious parliament of the Russian Federation voted to appoint Kozyrev the foreign minister. After the failed Soviet coup attempt of 1991, he found himself in president Boris Yeltsin's team of young reformers, which included Yegor Gaidar and Anatoly Chubais, and shared their Western liberal-democratic ideals. He became Russian foreign minister at the age of 39 and gained and kept the confidence of Boris Yeltsin as Russia became an independent state and, in many ways, the successor to the Soviet Union. Kozyrev tried to make Russia a partner with the West in the formation of the post-Cold War world. He emphasized cooperation over conflict with the United States while insisting that Russia be treated as a great power in international politics rather than as a fallen superpower. He favored major arms control agreements with the United States and the nonproliferation of nuclear arms. He was also viewed by many as one of the most important voices for liberalism and democracy in post-communist Russia.

Kozyrev was one of the drafters of the Belovezh Accords. He wrote in his 2019 memoir: “The signed document establishing the commonwealth (of independent states) was in effect a death sentence for the Soviet Union, the largest country on earth and our fatherland. It was an emotional moment for us. Yet we knew it was inevitable, and we had done our best to avoid a much more disastrous outcome."

In 1992 Kozyrev together with nine other Ministers of Foreign Affairs from the Baltic Sea area, and an EU commissioner, founded the Council of the Baltic Sea States (CBSS) and the EuroFaculty.

On 15 December 1992, Kozyrev underlined his opposition to conservative, nationalistic forces in Russia with a dramatic and unprecedented diplomatic maneuver. He stunned the foreign ministers of the Conference on Security and Cooperation in Europe (CSCE) and the Russian delegation alike with a speech that echoed many of the positions of the nationalist opposition in Russia, and seemed to threaten a return to anti-Western policies. But an hour after giving the speech he retracted it, warning that the views he had earlier espoused reflected "the demands of the most extreme elements of the opposition in Russia". He had reason to worry, for one month earlier Pravda had reported that he was "splitting into pieces the former socialist camp … Kozyrev in effect is paving the way for the expansion of a new American empire." Others accused the "young reformers" in the Gaidar government of breaking "historical" ties with Warsaw Pact partners and Kozyrev of abandoning the "traditional" zone of Russian interests thanks to his obsession with a pro-Western foreign policy. The CSCE speech occurred a scant five days after the defenestration of Gaidar.

Kozyrev painted Yevgeny Primakov, his contemporary at the newly-formed SVR, as a reactionary who entertained "the usual prejudices against NATO."

At the UN General Assembly Kozyrev declared in 1993, by the time of the Sukhumi massacre of the War in Abkhazia (1992–93): "Russia realizes that no international organization or group of states can replace our peacekeeping efforts in this specific post-Soviet space."

Kozyrev tried to promote the idea of dual nationality in the former Soviet empire but was unsuccessful.

There is still some question as to his role in the confusion of Yeltsin over the German re-unification and Helsinki Final Act and ensuing Partnership for Peace push for NATO expansion double-cross conceived by US Secretary of State Warren Christopher. The window of opportunity to bring Russia into NATO closed by the end of Yeltsin's first term of office because the only way to avoid an explosion of fear in Russia was to bring Russia out of the cold first before the other Warsaw Pact countries; in the event, the opposite was done.

US Secretaries of State that were his opposite number during his tenure were: Jim Baker, Lawrence Eagleburger and Warren Christopher.

NNPT and conflict with Ukraine over Crimea
In October 1991 Vice President Alexander Rutskoi went to Kiev to negotiate the price of Russian natural gas exports to Ukraine, and through Ukrainian territory to Europe. On that visit he also claimed Russian control and ownership of the Black Sea fleet, based in Sevastopol, and, indirectly, Russian sovereignty over the whole Crimean Peninsula. Rutskoi publicly warned Kiev against conflict with Moscow, which both had nuclear weapons and had the ability to claim sovereignty over Crimea.

In April 1992 and March 1993 two similar resolutions that claimed Crimea were passed by the Russian Federation parliament. The Ukrainians naturally turned for help to the United States, but it sought to aggregate Soviet nuclear weapons in the hands of Moscow and to occupy ex-Soviet scientists with the Nunn–Lugar Cooperative Threat Reduction programme. The Budapest Memorandum, which was co-written by Kozyrev, provided security assurances to the three minor ex-Soviet countries in exchange for their accession to the Nuclear non-proliferation treaty and security guarantees from Russia, the US and Great Britain. By the end of 1996 all nuclear weapons were removed to Russian territory, and 18 years later Vladimir Putin reneged on the deal.

State Duma
In the December 1993 elections, Kozyrev ran for a seat in the lower house, the State Duma, as a candidate on the list of the liberal Russia's Choice bloc in the Murmansk region. He took a seat as a representative from Murmansk when the State Duma met in January 1994, having won 60 percent of the vote in a field of 10.

He had been blamed for the international controversy over the conflict in Chechnya. He had also been targeted as a scapegoat for failing to stop North Atlantic Treaty Organization (NATO) bombing of the Bosnian Serbs and of NATO plans to expand into Eastern Europe.

Kozyrev was criticized by the Russian State Duma for capitulating to the West, which led to Russia's loss of "superpower" status, as well as for the alleged failure to support the Bosnian Serbs during the Bosnian War.

After being elected a second time to the State Duma in Murmansk in January 1996, Kozyrev left the ministry as from now on it was prohibited to occupy both positions. He was succeeded as head of the MFA by Yevgeny Primakov. It was a political choice both by him and president. When asked if he had been "sacrificed by Yeltsin ... to pacify anti-reform forces?", Kozyrev told the Los Angeles Times, "of course, there has been some backtracking. Let's face it, there is stagnation. ... It was a genuine political conflict. I lost. I was overruled. I believe that my time will come again, that my policies will be brought back, sooner or later." Since the conclusion of the second Duma term Kozyrev left the government for private business.

Kozyrev was a member of the Duma until the year 2000 elections.

Later life, memoirs and punditry

Kozyrev, who is convinced that the "authoritarian, anti-Western system Mr. Putin has re-imposed will not prevail", moved to the US in 2010, and has lived at least since 2015 in Miami, from where he published in 2019 a memoir of his time at the centre of Yeltsinian intrigue:
 The Firebird: The Elusive Fate of Russian Democracy (Foreword by Michael McFaul. Pittsburgh: The University of Pittsburgh Press, 2019)

Kozyrev warned a 2014 audience of diplomats that "Empty promises are even worse than empty threats."

In his memoir Kozyrev "complains that the U.S. aggressively pushed Russia out of its own traditional markets, (i.e. the Warsaw Pact countries) leaving Moscow to nurse its wounds and sell weapons and technology to rogue regimes. Overall, he feels that the West lacked "a figure of Winston Churchill’s caliber" in the 1990s who would have helped Russia make the perilous transition to democracy."

In an audience at the James A. Baker III Institute for Public Policy in 2020 Kozyrev said Obama's response to the 2014 Crimean status referendum and subsequent Annexation of Crimea by the Russian Federation was "feeble".

Kozyrev feels that some of the problems in Chechnya stem from the particular brand of Wahhabi Islam supplied to the natives by Saudi Arabia.

Kozyrev wrote somewhat presciently in 2016 of his time in government that "In the worst case, there could be a replay of the Yugoslavia catastrophe. The region was at a tipping point, and unfortunately, despite initial success, the democratizing forces inside the Russian government did not succeed."

Kozyrev was a distinguished fellow at the Wilson Center’s Kennan Institute in 2016.

2022 Russian invasion of Ukraine 

Kozyrev has been an outspoken critic of the 2022 Russian invasion of Ukraine, and of Russian President Vladimir Putin's attitude towards the west, stating, "All of these guys, mostly from the KGB, never agreed that the Soviet Union lost the Cold War to the Russian people together with the democratic world outside. They don’t buy it. They want to stop it. And now they think this [invasion of Ukraine] is their last decisive battle."Kozyrev said he anticipated that Kremlin officials may oust Putin following failures in the invasion.

In an early interview Kozyrev proposed the supply of armaments by NATO partners rather than a direct confrontation with Russia. He stressed that Putin will not stop his westward conquest with Ukraine if he is not stopped there, and lamented the fact that the Ukrainians had been improperly armed until after the invasion began. Putin cannot be provoked, laughs Kozyrev, as he is already in a heightened state of aggression and will perceive any weakness as an invitation to further aggression. Kozyrev, who wrote the Budapest Memorandum, calls the invasion "a flagrant violation" of its terms and finds the conduct of Putin in this regard shameful. Kozyrev is disappointed in the evolution of Sergey Lavrov. Kozyrev observes that Putin was fearful of COVID-19 and hence he surmises that Putin is so attached to this life that he will not risk nuclear war; he finds Putin to be the anti-Russian epitome.

In another interview Kozyrev, who tweeted on 1 March for Russian diplomats to resign, said Putin "acts out of desperation. That is clear."

In one interview broadcast when the Russian failure to capture the capital was become evident, he called Putin a "lunatic… detached from reality… delusional". Kozyrev opined that Putin thought the West weak and decadent. Kozyrev thought this war a disaster.

Kozyrev wrote in May 2022 an essay for the Journal of Democracy entitled "Why Putin Must Be Defeated" that he and Andrey Vladimirovich Kolesnikov remark the parallels between the post-1933 Gleichschaltung that Nazified German society and the several laws passed by the Russians and executive orders signed Putin "basically [to] criminaliz[e] all forms of dissent" and to dismiss the remnants of independent Russian media. He observes sadly that Anton Troianovski wrote that "The history of mass execution and political imprisonment in the Soviet era, and the denunciation of fellow citizens encouraged by the state… now looms over Russia’s deepening… repression," and finds the two 20th-century system to have one thread in common: totalitarianism.

Academic criticisms
Australian academic Russologist Graeme Gill finds Kozyrev's tenure at the Russian MFA "rather supine".

Sergey Radchenko finds Kozyrev's 2019 memoir to offer "fascinating insights into Moscow’s foreign policy at a time when everything seemed possible, including, perhaps, a prosperous, democratic Russia that was anchored in the West. Kozyrev chased that goal like that firebird of the Russian fairy tale, after which the book is titled, though unlike the hero of the Russian fairy tale, he never managed to catch it. Didn’t even come close."

References

Bibliography
 George Fujii. "H-Diplo Review Essay 292 on Kozyrev. The Firebird: The Elusive Fate of Russian Democracy" (2020) online
 Tsygankov, Andrei P. Russia's foreign policy: change and continuity in national identity (Rowman & Littlefield, 2019).

External links

1951 births
Foreign ministers of Russia
Living people
Politicians from Brussels
Soviet diplomats
Ambassador Extraordinary and Plenipotentiary (Soviet Union)
Moscow State Institute of International Relations alumni
Russian expatriates in the United States
First convocation members of the State Duma (Russian Federation)
Second convocation members of the State Duma (Russian Federation)
Russian activists against the 2022 Russian invasion of Ukraine